The following is a list of players that were named to the Associated Press All-Pro Team, the Newspaper Enterprise Association All-Pro team and the Pro Football Writers Association, and Pro Football Weekly All-Pro teams in 1971. Both first- and second- teams are listed for the NEA, and PFWA  teams. These are the four All-Pro teams that are included in the Total Football II: The Official Encyclopedia of the National Football League and compose the Consensus All-pro team for 1971.

Teams

Key
AP = Associated Press All-Pro team
PFWA = Pro Football Writers Association All-Pro team
NEA = Newspaper Enterprise Association All-Pro team
NEA-2 Newspaper Enterprise Association Second-team All-Pro
PFW = Pro Football Weekly All-Pro team
t = players tied in votes.

References

Pro-Football-Reference.com

All-Pro Teams
Allpro